is a Japanese football player. He was born in Kashihara, Nara, but was raised in Kashiwara, Osaka. He plays for Tegevajaro Miyazaki. Kazuto Sakamoto is his brother.

Playing career
Shoichiro Sakamoto joined to Zweigen Kanazawa in 2014. In June 2015, he moved to Tegevajaro Miyazaki.

References

External links

1995 births
Living people
Association football people from Osaka Prefecture
Association football people from Nara Prefecture
People from Kashiwara, Osaka
People from Kashihara, Nara
Japanese footballers
J2 League players
J3 League players
Zweigen Kanazawa players
Association football forwards